Spathulenol is a tricyclic sesquiterpene alcohol which has a basic skeleton similar to the azulenes.  It occurs in oregano among other plants.

History and occurrence
A volatile oil was extracted from waterwort distillery (Artemisia vulgaris) and tarragon (Artemisia dracunculus), from which the sesquiterpene alcohol spathulenol was isolated for the first time in 1975 as a colorless, viscous compound with an earth-aromatic odor and bitter-spicy taste.

References

Sesquiterpenes
Herbal distillates